Larry Richmond is a former  American football coach. He served as the head football coach at Harding University in Searcy, Arkansas from 1988 to 1993, compiling a record of 37–25–1. Richmond's 1989 Harding squad won the Arkansas Intercollegiate Conference championship.

A native of West Memphis, Arkansas, Richmond played defensive end and linebacker at Harding under head coach John Prock from 1970 to 1972.

Head coaching record

College

References

Year of birth missing (living people)
Living people
American football defensive ends
American football linebackers
Harding Bisons football coaches
Harding Bisons football players
High school football coaches in Louisiana
High school football coaches in Texas
People from West Memphis, Arkansas
Coaches of American football from Arkansas
Players of American football from Arkansas